The Montezuma Community School District is a rural public school district that serves the town of Montezuma, Iowa, and surrounding areas in southern Poweshiek County, including much of Deep River.

The school's mascot is the Braves. Their colors are blue and white.

History
In 1992, the Deep River–Millersburg Community School District (DR-M) closed its secondary school and established a whole grade-sharing program with both the Montezuma Community School District and the English Valleys Community School District. Secondary students from DR-M chose which school district they wished to attend for junior and senior high school.

On July 1, 2009, the DR-M was consolidated into the English Valleys Community School District, although a portion of it was split to the Montezuma Community School District.

Schools
The district operated three schools in one building at 504 N 4th Street in Montezuma.
Montezuma Elementary School
Montezuma Junior High School
Montezuma High School

Montezuma High School

Athletics
The Braves compete in the South Iowa Cedar League Conference in the following sports:

Cross Country (boys and girls)
Volleyball 
Football
Basketball (boys and girls)
Boys' State Champions - 1971, 1990, 2021
 Girls' State Champions - 1969, 1970
Wrestling
Track and Field (boys and girls)
Golf (boys and girls)
Baseball 
Softball

See also
List of school districts in Iowa
List of high schools in Iowa

References

External links
 Montezuma Community Schools

Education in Poweshiek County, Iowa
School districts in Iowa